Walter Smith was an English professional footballer who played as a winger.

References

Footballers from Grimsby
English footballers
Association football wingers
Grimsby All Saints F.C. players
Grimsby Town F.C. players
English Football League players